Moshe Ya'akov Vardi  is an Israeli mathematician and computer scientist. He is a Professor of Computer Science at Rice University, United States. He is University Professor, the Karen Ostrum George Professor in Computational Engineering, Distinguished Service Professor, and director of the Ken Kennedy Institute for Information Technology. His interests focus on applications of logic to computer science, including database theory, finite model theory, knowledge in multi-agent systems, computer-aided verification and reasoning, and teaching logic across the curriculum. He is an expert in model checking, constraint satisfaction and database theory, common knowledge (logic), and theoretical computer science.

Vardi has authored or co-authored over 600 technical papers as well as editing  several collections. He has authored the books Reasoning About Knowledge with Ronald Fagin, Joseph Halpern, and Yoram Moses, and Finite Model Theory and Its Applications  with Erich Grädel, Phokion G. Kolaitis, Leonid Libkin, Maarten Marx, Joel Spencer, Yde Venema, and Scott Weinstein. He is senior editor of Communications of the ACM, after serving as its editor-in-chief for a decade.

Education 
Vardi was an undergraduate student at Bar-Ilan University and received his Master of Science degree from the Weizmann Institute of Science. His PhD was supervised by Catriel Beeri and awarded by the Hebrew University of Jerusalem in 1981.

Career and research
Vardi's research interests are in logic and computation. He served as chair of the computer science department at Rice University from January 1994 until June 2002. Prior to joining Rice in 1993, he worked at IBM Research and was also a postdoctoral researcher at Stanford University. Vardi serves as an editor of several international journals and is the president of the International Federation of Computational Logicians. He has also co-chaired the Association for Computing Machinery (ACM) task force on job migration.

Awards and honors 

Vardi is the recipient of three IBM Outstanding Innovation Awards, a co-winner of the 2000 Gödel Prize (for work on temporal logic with finite automata), winner of the Knuth Prize in 2021, a co-winner of the  Paris Kanellakis Award in 2005, and a co-winner of the LICS 2006 Test-of-Time Award. He is also the recipient of the 2008 and 2017 ACM Presidential Award, the 2008 Blaise Pascal Medal in computational science by the European Academy of Sciences, the 2010 Distinguished Service Award from the Computing Research Association, the Institute of Electrical and Electronics Engineers (IEEE) Computer Society's 2011 Harry H. Goode Memorial Award, the 2018 ACM Special Interest Group for Logic and Computation (SIGLOG), the European Association for Theoretical Computer Science (EATCS), the European Association for Computer Science Logic (EACSL), and the Kurt Gödel Society (KGS) jointly sponsored Alonzo Church Award for Outstanding Contributions to Logic and Computation (with Tomas Feder). Vardi also holds honorary doctorates from eight Universities:

 Saarland University, Germany
 University of Orléans
 Grenoble Alpes University (UGA) in France
 Federal University of Rio Grande do Sul (UFRGS) in Brazil
 University of Liège in Belgium
 TU Wien in Austria
 University of Edinburgh in Scotland
 University of Gothenburg in Sweden

Vardi is a Guggenheim Fellow, ACM Fellow, AAAI Fellow and a Fellow of  the American Association for the Advancement of Science. He was designated a highly cited researcher by the Institute for Scientific Information, and was elected as a member of the US National Academy of Engineering, the National Academy of Sciences, the European Academy of Sciences, and the Academia Europaea (MAE). He was elected a Fellow of the American Academy of Arts and Sciences in 2010. He was included in the 2019 class of fellows of the American Mathematical Society "for contributions to the development and use of mathematical logic in computer science".

Personal life
Vardi lives with his wife Pamela Geyer in Bellaire, Texas. His step-son Aaron Hertzmann is also a computer scientist at Adobe Research.

References 

1954 births
Living people
Hebrew University of Jerusalem alumni
IBM employees
Israeli computer scientists
Israeli editors
Israeli mathematicians
Israeli science writers
Fellows of the Association for the Advancement of Artificial Intelligence
Fellows of the Association for Computing Machinery
Fellows of the American Association for the Advancement of Science
Fellows of the American Mathematical Society
Formal methods people
Gödel Prize laureates
Knuth Prize laureates
Mathematical logicians
Members of Academia Europaea
Members of the United States National Academy of Engineering
Members of the United States National Academy of Sciences
IBM Research computer scientists
People from Haifa
Rice University faculty